The 2005 Grand Prix of Atlanta was the second race for the 2005 American Le Mans Series season held at Road Atlanta.  It took place on April 17, 2005.

Official results

Class winners in bold.  Cars failing to complete 70% of winner's distance marked as Not Classified (NC).

Statistics
 Pole Position - #16 Dyson Racing - 1:11.241
 Fastest Lap - #1 ADT Champion Racing - 1:12.784
 Distance - 
 Average Speed -

External links
 

A
Grand Prix of Atlanta
2015 in sports in Georgia (U.S. state)